Joanne McCarthy (born October 26, 1974) is an American former professional basketball player.

Personal life
McCarthy was born near Chicago to a Catholic family of Irish, German, and Polish heritage. She is the third of four sisters: Lynette, actress/model Jenny, and Amy. Her cousin is Melissa McCarthy who is an actress.

College athletic career
McCarthy set the University of Illinois-Chicago career scoring and assists records in 1997.  As of 2020, McCarthy continues to hold the career record for points, and is third in assists.

UIC statistics
Source

Professional athletics
She was drafted with the first pick of the fifth round of the 1998 American Basketball League draft by the Chicago Condors.  She played in six games for the Condors during the 1998 season.

Notes

Basketball players from Chicago
Living people
1974 births
Chicago Condors players
UIC Flames women's basketball players
Joanne